Lori Grinker (born 1957) is an American documentary art photographer and filmmaker from New York City. She is best known for her self-directed, long-term documentary projects, and has conducted these projects through photography, video and multimedia. Grinker has had two books of her work published and been exhibited internationally.

Life and work
Grinker studied photography at Parsons School of Design in New York City with Bernice Abbott, George Tice, and Lisette Model. While at Parsons, she conducted a photo essay on boxers who worked with boxing trainer Cus D'Amato. Although her project focused on nine-year-old pugilist Billy Hamm, she also met 13-year-old Mike Tyson during this time, and would continue to photograph him for the next ten years, including his 1988 Sports Illustrated magazine Cover. Grinker also covered 9/11, and took one of her most well-known photographs of firefighters raising the flag at Ground Zero during this time.

For her book The Invisible Thread: A Portrait of Jewish American Women (co-authored with writer Diana Bletter) she traveled across America documenting the stories of Jewish women and what tied them together. Her book Afterwar: Veterans from a World in Conflict is an exploration of the effects of war on its many actors and victims after the wars have ended. In 2012 Grinker worked on her first short documentary, The Little Freedom Church (for the Black Heritage Network). In 2013 her self-produced and directed video Wilderness After War for the Dart Society about the effects of Posttraumatic stress disorder (PTSD) on three former U.S. service members was featured on PBS Newshour.

Her work is included in the collection of the Museum of Fine Arts Houston.

Publications
The Invisible Thread: A Portrait of Jewish American Women
Afterwar: Veterans from a World in Conflict

References

External links 

Parsons School of Design alumni
American women photographers
American photojournalists
American women artists
Living people
1957 births
American women journalists
21st-century American women
Women photojournalists